MMN may refer to:

 Mismatch negativity
 Multifocal motor neuropathy
 Mystery meat navigation
 Matematikmaskinnämnden, the Swedish Board for Computing Machinery
 Mamanwa language, a Central Philippine language (ISO 639-3 code)
 Ticker symbol for Mannesmann AG, a German corporation